Norman Simmons (1915–2004), was a DNA research pioneer.

Norman Simmons or Simmonds may also refer to:

Norman Simmons (musician) (1929–2021), American jazz pianist and arranger
Norman Simmons, character in Bookworm, Run!
Norman Alan Simmons, in 2000 New Year Honours for food safety
Norman Simmonds, fictional character
Norman Symonds, composer